Eshghi is a Persian name common in Iran.

People with Eshghi as last/family name 
 Gohar Eshghi, Iranian civil activist,
 Leili Echghi, Iranian sociologist
 Mirzadeh Eshghi, Iranian political writer
 Pasha Eshghi, Canadian filmmaker

Persian-language names